Periplaneta is a genus of cockroaches.

Selected species
Species include:

 Periplaneta aboriginea Roth, 1994
 Periplaneta americana (Linnaeus, 1758) – American cockroach
 Periplaneta australasiae (Fabricius, 1775) – Australian cockroach
 Periplaneta brunnea Burmeister, 1838 – Brown cockroach
 Periplaneta fuliginosa (Serville, 1839) – Smokybrown cockroach
 Periplaneta japanna Asahina, 1969
 Periplaneta japonica Karny, 1908 – Japanese cockroach

Cockroach genera